Giovanni Battista Pioda (4 October 1808, in Locarno – 3 November 1882) was a Swiss politician and member of the Swiss Federal Council (1857–1864).

He was elected to the Federal Council of Switzerland on 30 July 1857 and resigned on 26 January 1864. He was affiliated to the Free Democratic Party of Switzerland. During his time in office he held the Department of Home Affairs.

External links

1808 births
1882 deaths
People from Locarno
Free Democratic Party of Switzerland politicians
Members of the Federal Council (Switzerland)
Members of the National Council (Switzerland)
Presidents of the National Council (Switzerland)
Members of the Council of States (Switzerland)
Ambassadors of Switzerland to Italy